The Kid from Left Field is a 1979 American made-for-television baseball comedy film starring Gary Coleman and Robert Guillaume.  Coleman's first film, it is a remake of the 1953 film of the same name.

Plot

Jackie Robinson "J.R." Cooper is a kid who loves baseball, and also the son of a former major leaguer now down on his luck (and now  a vendor working the stands at games).  J.R. parlays his baseball knowledge into becoming manager of the San Diego Padres and leading them to the World Series.

Primary Cast
 Gary Coleman - Jackie Robinson "J.R." Cooper
 Robert Guillaume - Larry Cooper
 Gary Collins - Pete Sloane
 Ed McMahon - Fred Walker 
 Tricia O'Neil - Marion Fowler
 Tab Hunter - Bill Lorant

Reception

A vehicle for NBC to try to enhance Coleman's growing stardom from the sitcom Diff'rent Strokes, the television movie first aired on Sunday, September 30, 1979.  It was the 15th highest-rated prime time show of the week, with a Nielsen rating of 21.4.  Critics, however, did not love the film, which was plainly directed at younger viewers.  Tom Shales of The Washington Post wrote "there is no point in listing the credits ... because no credit is due."  After Coleman died in 2010 and Jeff Pearlman wrote a tribute to the film in Sports Illustrated, director Adell Aldrich commented "we weren't trying to win awards, but we did want to make something people would enjoy."  Vince Edwards had originally been picked to direct, but quit after two days because he didn't want to work with children.

NBC held a special preview of the film after a San Diego Padres game on September 21, 1979.  Oddly enough, the day after the film first aired on television, the Padres hired their announcer Jerry Coleman (who also appeared in the film as the team's announcer) as their new manager.  This led to some jokes that the team had meant to hire Gary Coleman.

Award 
At a dinner ceremony, Sunday evening, December 7, 1980, Gary Coleman, on behalf of the film, accepted the Image Award for "Best Children's Special or Episode in a Series," at the 13th NAACP Image Awards at the Hollywood Palladium.

Home media
The film was released on VHS by Vestron Video in 1984.  It has not been released on DVD.

References

External links
 
 

1979 television films
1979 films
1979 comedy films
1970s English-language films
1970s sports comedy films
Remakes of American films
American baseball films
American comedy television films
American sports comedy films
Comedy film remakes
Films scored by David Michael Frank
Films set in San Diego
Films with screenplays by Jack Sher
NBC network original films
San Diego Padres
Sports television films
Television remakes of films
1970s American films